Florence Ashley is a transfeminine academic, activist and doctoral student at the University of Toronto. They specialise in trans law and bioethics. They have numerous academic publications, including a book on the law and policy of banning transgender conversion practices. Florence served as the first openly transfeminine clerk at the Supreme Court of Canada. They are a winner of the Canadian Bar Association SOGIC Hero Award.

Biography

Personal Life and Education 
Ashley came out as trans and transitioned in 2015. They use singular they pronouns.

Ashley attended McGill University in Montreal, Canada, where they studied law. Ashley graduated with a Bachelor of Civil Law and Juris Doctor in 2017, and with a Master of Laws in 2019. They are currently a doctoral student at the University of Toronto Faculty of Law, where they research the law and bioethics surrounding clinical practices affecting trans youth.

In 2019 Ashley became the first known openly transgender clerk at the Supreme Court of Canada, where they worked in the chambers of Justice Sheilah Martin. During the same year, the Canadian Bar Association awarded Ashley the SOGIC Hero Award.

In 2022, Ashley published the book Banning Transgender Conversion Practices: A Legal and Policy Analysis. The book is about conversion therapy for transgender people and studies how they can be legally banned, and what impact this ban would have on the countries which would decide to implement these laws. Ashley believes that conversion therapy needs to disappear and that a formal ban improves the situation without fully solving the issue. They cite the Centre for Addiction and Mental Health in Toronto as an example of practices that were so bad, they served as a precedent to get conversion therapy banned in the province of Ontario.

Academic Publications

Books 

 Banning Transgender Conversion Practices: A Legal and Policy Analysis, 2022

Articles 

 Youth Should Decide: The Principle of Subsidiarity in Pediatric Transgender Healthcare, Journal of Medical Ethics (2022)
 Ridding Canadian Medicine of Conversion Therapy, CMAJ , vol. 194(1), p. E17–18 (2021)
 The Constitutive In/visibility of the Trans Legal Subject: A Case Study UCLA Women's Law Journal, vol. 28(1), p. 423–57 (2021)
 The Misuse of Gender Dysphoria: Toward Greater Conceptual Clarity in Transgender Health, Perspectives on Psychological Science , vol. 16(6), p. 1159–64 (2021)
 Preventing transition “regret”: An institutional ethnography of gender-affirming medical care assessment practices in Canada, Social Science & Medicine, Volume 291 (2021)
 The Clinical Irrelevance of “Desistance” Research for Transgender and Gender Creative Youth, Psychology of Sexual Orientation and Gender Diversity (2021)

Essays 

 'Trans' is my gender modality: a modest terminological proposal, Trans Bodies, Trans Selves, 2nd ed., Laura Erickson-Schroth (ed.), Oxford University Press (2022) (forthcoming)

References 

Living people
21st-century Canadian women writers
Clerks of the Supreme Court of Canada
Canadian LGBT rights activists
McGill University alumni
Transgender studies academics
Canadian transgender writers
Transgender women
Year of birth missing (living people)
21st-century Canadian LGBT people